Barisal Sadar is an upazila of Barisal District in the division of Barisal, Bangladesh.

Geography
It has a total area of 324.41 km2.

Demographics

According to the 2011 Bangladesh census, Barisal Sadar Upazila had 114,774 households and a population of 527,017, 65.3% of whom lived in urban areas. 8.8% of the population was under the age of 5. The literacy rate (age 7 and over) was 69.3%, compared to the national average of 51.8%.

Administration
Barisal Sadar Upazila is divided into ten union parishads: Chandpura, Chandramohan, Char Baria, Char Kowa, Char Monai, Jagua, Kashipur, Roypasha-Karapur, Shayestabad, and Tungibaria. The union parishads are subdivided into 105 mauzas and 110 villages.

Notable people
Hayat Mahmud, feudal lord, commander and founder of Miah Bari Mosque
Syed Faizul Karim, Islamic scholar and politician
Syed Fazlul Karim, founder of Islami Andolan Bangladesh
Syed Rezaul Karim, incumbent Pir of Char Monai

See also
 Upazilas of Bangladesh
 Districts of Bangladesh
 Divisions of Bangladesh

References

Upazilas of Barisal District